Laure Isabelle Kuetey (born 6 March 1971) is a Beninese sprinter who specializes in the Women's 100 meters and the Women's 200 metres events. She competed at the 200 metres event in the 1996 Summer Olympics, and the 100 metres event in the 1992 and 2000 Summer Olympics respectively. In addition, she was also the flag bearer for Benin in the 1996 and 2000 Summer Olympics opening ceremony.

Besides competing in the Olympics, Laure also competed at the Women's 100 metres event in the 1991 World Championships in Athletics, 1997 World Championships in Athletics and the 1999 All-Africa Games.

References

1971 births
Living people
Beninese female sprinters
Athletes (track and field) at the 1992 Summer Olympics
Athletes (track and field) at the 1996 Summer Olympics
Athletes (track and field) at the 2000 Summer Olympics
Olympic athletes of Benin
World Athletics Championships athletes for Benin
Athletes (track and field) at the 1999 All-Africa Games
African Games competitors for Benin
Olympic female sprinters